

First round selections

The following are the first round picks in the 1971 Major League Baseball draft.

* Did not sign

Other notable selections

* Did not sign

Background 
The June 1971 draft was a productive one, even though none of its top ten choices yielded players who would have memorable major league careers. Selected in the regular phase were future Hall of Famers Jim Rice (Boston, 1st round), George Brett (Kansas City, 2nd round) and Mike Schmidt (Philadelphia, 2nd round).

Pitcher Mike Flanagan was selected in the 15th round of the June regular phase by Houston, but enrolled at the University of Massachusetts. One of the more interesting highlights of the June draft was that five quarterbacks were selected including future NFL stars Jim Plunkett, Archie Manning, Dan Pastorini, Steve Bartkowski, Joe Theismann as well as Condredge Holloway, who went on to have a career in the Canadian Football League, where he was awarded Most Outstanding Player while playing for the Toronto Argonauts. 

Danny Goodwin, the nation's top pick, could not agree to terms with the White Sox and became the first top choice who did not sign a contract, instead choosing to attend Southern University in Baton Rouge. Four years later, Goodwin was again selected first overall, this time by the Angels.

Notes

External links
Complete draft list from The Baseball Cube database

References 

Major League Baseball draft
Draft
Major League Baseball draft